Bhishma Shankar "Kushal" Tiwari (born 30 September 1960) is an Indian politician. He was a Member of Parliament in the 14th and 15th Lok Sabha, representing the Sant Kabir Nagar constituency of Uttar Pradesh as a member of the Bahujan Samaj Party political party. Tiwari joined Samajwadi Party in December 2021.

Life and education
Tiwari was born in Tanda to Hari Shankar Tiwari and Ramlali Devi. His highest attained education is intermediate. By profession, he is a farmer. His brother is politician Vinay Shankar Tiwari. Tiwari married Reena Tiwari on 6 June 1986. They have two sons and two daughters.

Political career
Tiwari started his political career as a member of the Bharatiya Janata Party, on whose ticket he contested the Lok Sabha elections from Balrampur in eastern Uttar Pradesh. Later, he represented Bahujan Samaj Party as an Member of Parliament in the 14th and 15th Lok Sabhafrom the Sant Kabir Nagar.

Tiwari joined Samajwadi Party in December 2021.

Posts held

See also
Sant Kabir Nagar (Lok Sabha constituency)

References 

1960 births
Living people
India MPs 2004–2009
India MPs 2009–2014
Bharatiya Janata Party politicians from Uttar Pradesh
Bahujan Samaj Party politicians from Uttar Pradesh
Lok Sabha members from Uttar Pradesh
People from Gorakhpur